Oscar Gundlach-Pedersen (17 May 1886 – 4 October 1960) was a Danish architect. His work was part of the architecture event in the art competition at the 1924 Summer Olympics.

References

1886 births
1960 deaths
19th-century Danish architects
20th-century Danish architects
Olympic competitors in art competitions
People from Odense